Spriana is a comune (municipality) in the Province of Sondrio in the Italian region Lombardy, located about  northeast of Milan and about  north of Sondrio.

Spriana borders the following municipalities: Montagna in Valtellina, Sondrio, Torre di Santa Maria.

Demographic evolution

References

External links
 www.comune.spriana.so.it

Cities and towns in Lombardy